"Out in the Country" is a song written by Paul Williams and Roger Nichols and performed by Three Dog Night. It was produced by Richard Podolor, and was featured on their 1970 album, It Ain't Easy.  In the US, "Out in the Country" peaked at number 11 on the US adult contemporary chart, and number 15 on the Billboard Hot 100 chart on October 17, 1970. Outside the US, the record reached number 9 in Canada, 
Released in the first year of Earth Day, "Out in the Country" was an early environmental advocacy song. The lyrics are about finding solace outside the city, "before the breathing air is gone..."

Cash Box described the song as having "Attractive material and an exciting TDN delivery [that] give the team another top forty blockbuster."

Chart performance

Weekly charts

Year-end charts

Other versions
Williams released a version on his 1972 album, Life Goes On.
R.E.M. covered it as a b-side for their 2003 single Bad Day.

References

External links
 Lyrics of this song
 

1970 songs
1970 singles
Songs written by Paul Williams (songwriter)
Songs written by Roger Nichols (songwriter)
Three Dog Night songs
R.E.M. songs
Dunhill Records singles
Environmental songs